Habo Municipality is a municipality in Jönköping County, southern Sweden, where the locality of Habo is seat.

The present municipality was formed in 1974 when a part of the dissolved rural municipality of Fågelsås was amalgamated with "old" Habo. It was transferred from the dissolved Skaraborg County to Jönköping County in 1998.

Geography
Things to do in the municipality include activities related to the lake Vättern, such as fishing, bathing and hiking. It offers plenty of nature and outdoor activities. Just outside the seat is a forest of beech woods planted by count Per Brahe the younger in the 17th century and lovely for recreational walks. And within the municipality two areas have been deemed important enough to be nature reserves:  Fiskebäck has a moist ground where hazel and oak have claimed most of the space in competition with aspen, bird cherry, birch, sallow, hawthorn, beech and ash; while Hökensås is distinguished by a varied terrain of valleys and slopes with some 50 tarns and small lakes and a fauna of great variety.

Localities
There are 3 urban areas (also called a Tätort or locality) in Habo Municipality.

In the table the localities are listed according to the size of the population as of December 31, 2005. The municipal seat is in bold characters.

Schools
Bränningeskolan 1975-
Fagerhults skola 1910-
Gröne Vägens Skola 1931-
Habo Centralskola 1953-1998 (Divided in 1998. Grades F-5 became Hagenskolan, grades 6-9 became Hagabodaskolan)
Hagenskolan 1998-
Hagabodaskolan 1998-
Kråkerydsskolan 1976-
Malmgårdsskolan 1996-

Sports
BIF Fagerhult, formed 1949. floorball late 1980s-
Habo Handboll, formed 1990. team handball 1990-
Habo IF, formed April 26, 1926. association football 1926- earlier even other sports, for example bandy (1926-1998)
Habo Wolley, formed 1987. volleyball
Hagaboda SK, formed 1989. floorball
Yellow Obah, formed 1995. volleyball (Farm team to Habo Wolley)

Sights

See also
 Because diacritics are often dropped on the English oriented Internet, Habo is sometimes confused with Håbo Municipality, located in the province of Uppland (near Stockholm).

References 
 Unless otherwise stated, the material is found on the official webpage
 1: Incorporated from :sv:Habo kyrka
 2: article Habo from Nordisk Familjebok (1909)
Statistics Sweden

External links 

 Habo Municipality - Official site

 
Municipalities of Jönköping County
Skaraborg